6174 is known as Kaprekar's constant after the Indian mathematician D. R. Kaprekar. This number is renowned for the following rule:

 Take any four-digit number, using at least two different digits (leading zeros are allowed).
 Arrange the digits in descending and then in ascending order to get two four-digit numbers, adding leading zeros if necessary.
 Subtract the smaller number from the bigger number.
 Go back to step 2 and repeat. 

The above process, known as Kaprekar's routine, will always reach its fixed point, 6174, in at most 7 iterations. Once 6174 is reached, the process will continue yielding 7641 – 1467 = 6174. For example, choose 1459:

9541 – 1459 = 8082
8820 – 0288 = 8532
8532 – 2358 = 6174
7641 – 1467 = 6174

The only four-digit numbers for which Kaprekar's routine does not reach 6174 are repdigits such as 1111, which give the result 0000 after a single iteration. All other four-digit numbers eventually reach 6174 if leading zeros are used to keep the number of digits at 4. For numbers with three identical numbers and a fourth number that is one number higher or lower (such as 2111), it is essential to treat 3-digit numbers with a leading zero; for example: 2111 – 1112 = 0999; 9990 – 999 = 8991; 9981 – 1899 = 8082; 8820 – 288 = 8532; 8532 – 2358 = 6174.

Other "Kaprekar's constants"

There can be analogous fixed points for digit lengths other than four; for instance, if we use 3-digit numbers, then most sequences (i.e., other than repdigits such as 111) will terminate in the value 495 in at most 6 iterations. Sometimes these numbers (495, 6174, and their counterparts in other digit lengths or in bases other than 10) are called "Kaprekar constants".

Other properties

 6174 is a 7-smooth number, i.e. none of its prime factors are greater than 7.
 6174 can be written as the sum of the first three degrees of 18:
 18 + 18 + 18 = 5832 + 324 + 18 = 6174, and coincidentally, 6 + 1 + 7 + 4 = 18.
 The sum of squares of the prime factors of 6174 is a square:
 2 + 3 + 3 + 7 + 7 + 7 = 4 + 9 + 9 + 49 + 49 + 49 = 169 = 13

References

External links

 
 Sample (Perl) code to walk any four-digit number to Kaprekar's Constant
 Sample (Python) code to walk any four-digit number to Kaprekar's Constant
 Sample (C) code to walk the first 10000 numbers and their steps to Kaprekar's Constant

Arithmetic dynamics
Kaprekar's constant
Integers